Sarah Trotman  is a businesswoman, director, celebrant and community advocate from Auckland, New Zealand. She has been a member of the Waitematā Local Board of Auckland Council since 2019.

Personal life 
Trotman is one of five children, including four girls. She grew up in Wellington, and attended St Michael's Primary School and St Mary's College. She lives in Auckland and has two children, Tilly and Elliot.

Business career 
Trotman began work at College Credit Management, a company owned and operated by her father. By the age of 25, Trotman became General Manager, responsible for 20 staff. She was also president of the industry association, Associated Credit Bureaux NZ Inc. She was a military police officer with the Territorial Association. Sarah Trotman was managing director of Bizzone; a business support company focused on small and medium businesses. She established Bizzone, which included Bizzone Business Expo, the Excellence in Business Support Awards and published Bizzone business support magazine. In 2011, Bizzone worked with Franchize Consultants to explore expansion to Australia.

She became Director of Business Relations at Auckland University of Technology Business school where she oversaw the AUT Excellence Support Awards and was also chair of AUT's Women on Campus.

Community work 
Trotman helped establish Auckland's Lifewise Big Sleepout fundraising event to support people out of homelessness, has mentored young women under the YWCA NZ Future Leaders Programme and is an active business mentor.

Trotman is a be.accessible Fab50 accessibility champion and a supporter of the Auckland Foundation's Women's Fund. She was a trustee of the Blake Trust for many years and currently sits on the Blake Trust Award selection panel.

Awards and recognition 
In 2017, Trotman was appointed as an Officer of the New Zealand Order of Merit for services to business and services to the community.  Her appointment recognised her work as Chief Executive of Business Mentors New Zealand, where she supervised free business mentoring for over 3,000 small businesses per year. It noted her as a former trustee of the Sir Peter Blake Trust and Leadership New Zealand,  It also acknowledged her as a small business support specialist, organising Business Expos, the Excellence in Business Support Awards, and the Bizzone Business Magazine.

Auckland local body election 
In the 2019 Auckland local elections, Trotman successfully stood as a candidate for a seat on the Waitemata Local Board of Auckland Council on the C&R – Communities and Residents ticket and was elected. She resigned in October 2021, following controversy surrounding the felling of exotic trees in Western Springs. She chose this a resignation date that would avoid a by-election. )
Trotman was a strong advocate of the Auckland Central community she represented. Prior to voting, she took her lead from community including the two controversial votes. They were the 95 sqr mtr Erebus Memorial in Dove Myer Robinson Park and the destruction of thousands of natives at Western Springs Forest. Trotman felt strongly that the Waitemata Local Board Resolution, to limit damage to the natives at Western Springs was not being implemented and her protest ended in her arrest.  Trotman's inappropriate to some, but courageous to others, and illegal behaviours also resulted in council conducting investigations against her, which have not diminished her standing in the eyes of her community..

References 

Living people
New Zealand women in business
Officers of the New Zealand Order of Merit
Year of birth missing (living people)